Frank Corvers (born 12 November 1969) is a Belgian former professional road cyclist.

Major results

1992
 1st Internationale Wielertrofee Jong Maar Moedig
1993
 5th Grote Prijs Jef Scherens
1994
 3rd Ronde van Limburg
 10th Tour of Flanders
1995
 1st Grand Prix d'Isbergues
 1st Brussels–Ingooigem
 2nd Grote Prijs Jef Scherens
 2nd Paris–Brussels
1996
 3rd Grand Prix de Wallonie
 8th Overall 4 Jours de Dunkerque
1997
 3rd Madsion, European Track Championships (with Etienne De Wilde)
 3rd Flèche Ardennaise
1999
 1st Grote 1-MeiPrijs
2000
 3rd Six Days of Ghent (with Adriano Baffi)

References

1969 births
Living people
Belgian male cyclists
People from Beringen, Belgium
Cyclists from Limburg (Belgium)